Jules Louis Rolland (24 March 1877 – 14 January 1929) was a French gymnast. He competed in the men's individual all-around event at the 1900 Summer Olympics and competed at the 1908 Summer Olympics.

References

External links

1877 births
1929 deaths
French male artistic gymnasts
Olympic gymnasts of France
Gymnasts at the 1900 Summer Olympics
Gymnasts at the 1908 Summer Olympics
People from Valentigney
Sportspeople from Doubs
20th-century French people